The Europe Zone was one of the three regional zones of the 1976 Davis Cup.

32 teams entered the Europe Zone, competing across 2 sub-zones, Zone A and Zone B. 7 teams entered the competition in the pre-qualifying rounds, competing for 3 spots in the preliminary rounds. The 3 winners in the pre-qualifying rounds joined an additional 21 teams in the preliminary rounds, with 12 teams in each sub-zone competing for 4 places in the main draw, to join the 4 finalists from the 1975 Europe Zone.

The winners of each sub-zone's main draw went on to compete in the Inter-Zonal Zone against the winners of the Americas Zone and Eastern Zone.

The Soviet Union defeated Hungary in the Zone A final, and Italy defeated Great Britain in the Zone B final, resulting in both the Soviet Union and Italy progressing to the Inter-Zonal Zone.

Zone A

Pre-qualifying round

Draw

Preliminary rounds

Draw

First round
Denmark vs. Finland

Monaco vs. Israel

Belgium vs. Netherlands

Qualifying Draw
West Germany vs. Denmark

Soviet Union vs. Monaco

Belgium vs. Hungary

Egypt vs. Ireland

Main draw

Draw

Quarterfinals
West Germany vs. Soviet Union

Hungary vs. Egypt

Semifinals
Soviet Union vs. Spain

Hungary vs. Czechoslovakia

Final
Soviet Union vs. Hungary

Zone B

Pre-qualifying rounds

Draw

Qualifying round
Luxembourg vs. Portugal

Preliminary rounds

Draw

First round
Iran vs. Switzerland

Bulgaria vs. Austria

Poland vs. Norway

Greece vs. Portugal

Qualifying round
Switzerland vs. Great Britain

Austria vs. Romania

Italy vs. Poland

Yugoslavia vs. Greece

Main draw

Draw

Quarterfinals
Great Britain vs. Romania

Italy vs. Yugoslavia

Semifinals
Great Britain vs. France

Italy vs. Sweden

Final
Great Britain vs. Italy

References

Davis Cup Europe/Africa Zone
Europe Zone
Davis Cup
Davis Cup
Davis Cup
Davis Cup
Davis Cup